"Dansa i neon" is a Swedish language song, sung by Swedish pop singer Lena Philipsson and finishing 5th at the Swedish Melodifestivalen 1987. "Dance in the Neon Light" is an English version of the Swedish language song. Dansa i neon was written by Tim Norell, Peo Thyrén and Ola Håkansson, and was first meant to have been performed by Lili & Susie. Ola Håkansson proposed that, but Sveriges Television said no.

Lena Philipsson released it as a single in 1987, which peaked at number nine on the Swedish Singles Chart. The song was also at Svensktoppen for 13 weeks during the period 22 March to 14 June 1987, with a second place during the debut week as best result there.

In 2011 Lena released a new version of the song in English entitled "Dance in the Neon Light" featuring the Swedish melodic metalcore band Dead by April.

Cover versions
 Swedish heavy metal group Black Ingvars covered "Dansa i neon" on their 1998 album Schlager Metal.
 The dansband Barbados covered "Dansa i neon" on the 2000 album Kom hem.
Thorsten Flinck and Ola Salo recorded the song in a duet on the 2004 Thorsten Flinck album Vildvuxna rosor.
Swedish singer and 3X Melodifestivalen entrant   Ace Wilder covered "Dansa I neon" to help promote a project she done in partnership with Swedish gambling lottery  Trisslott where Wilder designed new scratchcards named "Skrapa i neon" (Scratch The Neon).

English version

Philipsson sang the song and finished 5th at the Swedish Melodifestivalen 1987. During Melodifestivalen 2011 she performed the new version of her song with the Swedish metal band Dead by April as special guest before the winner was announced. The song was released as a digital single on 20 February 2011. The song was originally written by Tim Norell, Peo Thyrén and Ola Håkansson, but was re-arranged by Pontus Hjelm and Jimmie Strimell for the metal version with lyrics re-written in English by Lena Philipsson.

Track listing
Digital single

Charts

References

External links
"Dansa i neon" at the Swedish singles chart.

2011 singles
Lena Philipsson songs
English-language Swedish songs
Dead by April songs
1987 songs
Songs written by Tim Norell
Songs written by Ola Håkansson
Song recordings produced by Anders Hansson
Mariann Grammofon singles
Universal Records singles
Songs written by Peo Thyrén